The 2014 William Jones Cup was the 36th William Jones Cup, a top-level international basketball tournament of FIBA Asia. The tournament was held in Taiwan from 9–17 August 2014.

Men's tournament

Preliminary round 

|}
Four-way tie for first determined by head-to-head results amongst tied teams. Egypt defeated the other three teams.
The other three teams were again ranked via head-to-head records; all team had beaten each other at least once. The tie was subsequently broken by goal average.

All times in UTC+8.

Day 1

Day 2

Day 3

Day 4

Day 5

Day 6

Day 7

Classification round

Semifinals

Seventh place playoff

Fifth place playoff

Final round

Semifinals

Third place playoff

Final

Awards

References 

2014
2014–15 in Taiwanese basketball
2014–15 in American basketball
2014–15 in Asian basketball
2014 in African basketball
August 2014 sports events in Asia